Patrick O'Neal Howell (born August 31, 1968) is a former professional baseball player. He played part of one season in Major League Baseball for the New York Mets in 1992, primarily as a center fielder. He also played one season in the Chinese Professional Baseball League in 1998. Howell's strength as an athlete was blazing speed. He stole a lot of bases in the minor leagues and showed exceptional range in the field. However, he was not a strong hitter.

Early life
Howell was born in Mobile, Alabama and attended Vigor High School in Prichard, Alabama.

Professional career

New York Mets 
The Mets initially drafted howell in the 9th round of the 1987 amateur draft. After playing with their minor league baseball system for five seasons, he made his major league debut in 1992. He got a hit in his first big league at bat against the Astros' Pete Harnisch. That season, he batted a .187 with no home runs and 1 run batted in in 79 at bats over 31 games.

Minor leagues and overseas 
After the 1992 season, he was traded to the Minnesota Twins for Darren Reed. After playing one season in their farm system without returning to the majors, he became a free agent and re-signed with the Mets. After one season with the Mets, he left the affiliated minors, playing in the Mexican League from 1995 to 1997.

In 1998, Howell crossed the Pacific to play for the Brother Elephants in Taiwan, batting .264 in 24 games. He returned to the United States in 1999 with the Duluth–Superior Dukes in the Northern League. He played the next four seasons with the Nashua Pride of the Atlantic League before suffering a knee injury in July 2004. He tried to come back the following year but did not play professionally again.

As a minor leaguer, Howell batted .249 with 20 home runs and 290 runs batted in 1133 games.

References

External links

 
 Baseball Almanac

1968 births
Living people
American expatriate baseball players in Mexico
American expatriate baseball players in Taiwan
Atlantic City Surf players
Baseball players from Alabama
Binghamton Mets players
Brother Elephants players
Columbia Mets players
Diablos Rojos del México players
Duluth-Superior Dukes players
Kingsport Mets players
Long Island Ducks players
Major League Baseball center fielders
Nashua Pride players
New York Mets players
Norfolk Tides players
Pittsfield Mets players
Portland Beavers players
Sportspeople from Mobile, Alabama
St. Lucie Mets players
Tidewater Tides players
Tigres del México players
Vigor High School alumni
Williamsport Bills players
African-American baseball players